Turn Up the Volume is an upcoming Australian teen drama television series on ABC ME. The ten-part series follows a group of young female and gender-diverse teenagers who start a band called "The Volume" at a music camp held in Melbourne's inner west suburbs. It is inspired by the coming-of-age documentary No Time For Quiet which followed the first Girls Rock! Camp in Melbourne. The series is scheduled to premiere on 24 March 2023.

It was written by Dannika Horvat, Penelope Chai, Matthew Bon, Ciarán Hanrahan, Chloe Wong, Betiel Beyin and Leigh Lule. It was directed by Tenika Smith, Jub Clerc, Harry Lloyd, Jessie Oldfield and Adam Murfet. Music performed by "The Volume" is composed and produced by Josh Teicher and Sophia Exiner.

Cast
 Riya Mandrawa as Vivi
 Erza James as Hex
 Elaine King as Ginger
 Mira Russo as Breeze
 Ayiana Ncube as Jam

Supporting cast
 Jennifer Dao
 Justine Clarke
 Spencer McLaren
 Keith Brockett
 Debra Lawrence
 Dennis Coard
 Kaiya Jones
 Ben Chen
 Madison Lu
 Tim Rogers
 Joshua Mzila
 Jethro Dvorak

References

External links 
 

Australian Broadcasting Corporation original programming
2022 Australian television series debuts
Australian children's television series
Australian drama television series
English-language television shows
Television shows set in Australia